Johannes Kleiman (17 August 1896 – 28 January 1959) was one of the Dutch residents who helped hide Anne Frank and her family during the Nazi occupation of the Netherlands. In the published version of Frank's diary, Het Achterhuis, known in English as The Diary of a Young Girl, he is given the pseudonym Mr. Koophuis. In some later publications of the diary, the pseudonym was removed (just like the other protectors' pseudonyms), and Kleiman was referred to by his real name.

Kleiman was born in Koog aan de Zaan, the Netherlands and met Otto Frank in 1923, when he was trying to establish a branch of the Michael Frank Bank in Amsterdam. Kleiman was registered as a proxy for the bank in May 1924 and given full powers in December of that year when the bank went into liquidation. He was hired by Frank as a bookkeeper for Opekta and Pectacon in 1938, but had become a close friend from about 1933, when the Frank family fled to the Netherlands to escape Nazi persecution in Germany.

Johannes Kleiman became a member of the board of Opekta and the company was established at his home address for the next five months until it moved to Prinsengracht 263 at the end of 1940. He officially joined as bookkeeper for both Opekta and Pectacon, with Victor Kugler and secretary Bep Voskuijl for Pectacon, and Otto Frank and his secretary Miep Gies for Opekta.

On 4 August 1944, Kleiman was arrested with Victor Kugler during the Gestapo raid that arrested the Frank family and four other concealed Jews in the premises on the Prinsengracht. After interrogation at Gestapo headquarters, he and Kugler were transferred to a prison on the Amstelveenseweg for Jews and political prisoners awaiting deportation. Kleiman was imprisoned in the Amersfoort labour camp before he was released by special dispensation of the Red Cross because of his ill health. In all, he was a prisoner of the Nazis for about six weeks.

After the publication of Anne Frank's diary, which detailed her two years in hiding, Kleiman regularly took journalists and visitors around the former hiding place, which had been vacated in the early 1950s. He became very involved in the establishment of the Anne Frank Stichting (Anne Frank Foundation) on 3 May 1957 but did not live to see the building open as a museum in May 1960. He died, behind his desk, on 28 January 1959. Otto Frank was devastated about this loss. On 8 March 1972, Yad Vashem recognized Kleiman as one of the Righteous Among the Nations.

Further reading
 The Diary of Anne Frank: The Revised Critical Edition, Anne Frank, edited by Harry Paape, David Barnouw, and Gerrold van der Stroom of the Netherlands Institute for War Documentation (NIOD), translated by Arnold J. Pomerans, compiled by H. J. J. Hardy, second edition, Doubleday, 2003.
 Anne Frank Remembered, Miep Gies with Alison Leslie Gold, Simon and Schuster, 1988.
 Roses from the Earth: the Biography of Anne Frank, Carol Ann Lee, Penguin, 1999.
 Anne Frank: the Biography, Melissa Müller, with an afterword by Miep Gies, Bloomsbury, 1999.
 The Footsteps of Anne Frank, Ernst Schnabel, Pan, 1988.
 The Hidden Life of Otto Frank, Carol Ann Lee, Penguin, 2002 (US edition: William Morrow, 2003).

References

1896 births
1959 deaths
Dutch people of World War II
Dutch Righteous Among the Nations
People from Zaanstad
Anne Frank